Union Township, Arkansas may refer to:

 Union Township, Ashley County, Arkansas
 Union Township, Baxter County, Arkansas
 Union Township, Conway County, Arkansas
 Union Township, Crawford County, Arkansas
 Union Township, Faulkner County, Arkansas
 Union Township, Fulton County, Arkansas
 Union Township, Garland County, Arkansas
 Union Township, Greene County, Arkansas
 Union Township, Independence County, Arkansas
 Union Township, Izard County, Arkansas
 Union Township, Jackson County, Arkansas
 Union Township, Lee County, Arkansas
 Union Township, Marion County, Arkansas
 Union Township, Nevada County, Arkansas
 Union Township, Newton County, Arkansas
 Union Township, Ouachita County, Arkansas
 Union Township, Perry County, Arkansas
 Union Township, Prairie County, Arkansas
 Union Township, Randolph County, Arkansas
 Union Township, Saline County, Arkansas
 Union Township, Stone County, Arkansas
 Union Township, Van Buren County, Arkansas
 Union Township, White County, Arkansas

See also 
 List of townships in Arkansas
 Union Township (disambiguation)

Arkansas township disambiguation pages